PW may refer to:

Arts and media
 PW (rapper) (born 1992), English hip-hop artist
 Metal Gear Solid: Peace Walker, a 2010 video game
 Pauly-Wissowa, a short name for Realencyclopädie der classischen Altertumswissenschaft
 Pee Wee (singer) (born 1988), Mexican American singer and actor
 Perfect World (video game), an online roleplaying game
 Persistent world, a type of virtual world
 Philadelphia Weekly, a newspaper
 Practical Wireless, a UK-based amateur radio magazine
 Production Workshop, a Brown University theater
 Publishers Weekly, a trade magazine

Businesses and organizations
 Warsaw University of Technology, Politechnika Warszawska, a university in Poland
 Price Waterhouse, an accounting firm
 Pratt & Whitney, an aerospace manufacturer
 Protest Warrior, a political activist group
 Physics wallah, an online and offline education platform

Transportation
 Pacific Western Transportation, a bus transport company
 Providence and Worcester Railroad (reporting mark PW)
 Precision Air (IATA code PW), a current Tanzanian airline
 German Wings (IATA code PW), a 1983-1990 German airline
 Pacific Western Airlines (IATA code PW), a 1946-1987 Canadian airline

Places
 Palau (ISO code PW), an island nation
 Puerto Williams, a port in Chile

Science and technology
 .pw, the Internet domain for Palau
 Password, a code for authentication
 Pathetic Writer, a word processor software application
 Pennyweight, a unit of mass
 Petawatt (PW), a unit of power
 Picowatt (pW), a unit of power
 Precipitable water, a meteorological measure of the amount of water in the atmosphere
 Pseudo-wire, in computer networking and telecommunications

Other uses
 P. W. Botha (1916–2006), prime minister of South Africa
 Prisoner of war, a legal status in warfare
 Paul Walker (1973-2013), actor known for the Fast And Furious franchise.
 Kotwica, a World War II emblem of the Polish Underground State and Armia Krajowa.